Rambha Rural Municipality (Nepali :रम्भा गाउँपालिका) is a Gaunpalika in Palpa District in Lumbini Province of Nepal. On 12 March 2017, the government of Nepal implemented a new local administrative structure, with the implementation of the new local administrative structure, VDCs have been replaced with municipal and Village Councils. Rambha is one of these 753 local units.

References 

Palpa District
Lumbini Province
Rural municipalities of Nepal established in 2017